Micromentignatha is a genus of beetles in the family Cicindelidae, containing the following species:

 Micromentignatha leai (Sloane, 1905)
 Micromentignatha oblongicollis (W.J. MacLeay, 1888)

References

Cicindelidae